The white-tailed blue flycatcher (Elminia albicauda) is a species of bird in the family Stenostiridae. It is found in Angola, Burundi, Democratic Republic of the Congo, Malawi, Mozambique, Rwanda, Tanzania, Uganda, and Zambia.

Its natural habitats are subtropical or tropical dry forest, subtropical or tropical moist lowland forest, and dry savanna.

References

Elminia
Birds described in 1877
Taxonomy articles created by Polbot